Callistomimus is a genus of beetles in the family Carabidae, containing the following species:

 Callistomimus acuticollis Fairmaire, 1889
 Callistomimus aeolus Andrewes, 1937
 Callistomimus alluaudi Maindron, 1909
 Callistomimus alternans Andrewes, 1938
 Callistomimus amoenus Peringuey, 1896
 Callistomimus asper Andrewes, 1930
 Callistomimus azarensis Britton, 1937
 Callistomimus belli Andrewes, 1921
 Callistomimus bicolor Britton, 1937
 Callistomimus bimaculatus Britton, 1937
 Callistomimus caffer (Boheman, 1848)  
 Callistomimus cauliops (Bates, 1892)  
 Callistomimus chalcocephalus Wiedemann, 1823
 Callistomimus chevalieri Alluaud, 1932
 Callistomimus chlorocephalus Kohlar, 1836
 Callistomimus coarctatus Laferte-Senectere, 1851
 Callistomimus convexicollis Britton, 1937
 Callistomimus cyclotus Andrewes, 1938
 Callistomimus dabreui Andrewes, 1921
 Callistomimus davidsoni Mandl, 1986
 Callistomimus depressus Britton, 1937
 Callistomimus dicksoni G.O. Waterhouse, 1884
 Callistomimus dilaceratus Kolbe, 1889
 Callistomimus diversus Barker, 1922
 Callistomimus dollmani Britton, 1937
 Callistomimus dux Andrewes, 1921
 Callistomimus elegans (Boheman, 1848)
 Callistomimus exsul Kuntzen, 1919
 Callistomimus gabonicus Alluaud, 1932  
 Callistomimus gracilis Andrewes, 1931
 Callistomimus gratus Peringuey, 1896
 Callistomimus guineensis Alluaud, 1932
 Callistomimus guttatus Chaudoir, 1872
 Callistomimus hovanus Fairmaire, 1901
 Callistomimus insuetus Peringuey, 1896
 Callistomimus jucundus Andrewes, 1921
 Callistomimus kilimanus Alluaud, 1932
 Callistomimus latefasciatus Britton, 1937
 Callistomimus lebioides (Bates, 1892)
 Callistomimus littoralis (Motschulsky, 1859)
 Callistomimus maurus Mandl, 1986
 Callistomimus modestus Schaum, 1863
 Callistomimus nair (Maindron, 1909)
 Callistomimus nepalensis Habu, 1978
 Callistomimus nigropunctatostriatus Mandl, 1986
 Callistomimus nodieri Alluaud, 1932
 Callistomimus obscurus Barker, 1922
 Callistomimus okutanii Habu, 1952
 Callistomimus pachys Alluaud, 1932
 Callistomimus pernix Andrewes, 1936
 Callistomimus philippinus Jedlicka, 1935  
 Callistomimus placens Peringuey, 1904
 Callistomimus pseudojucundus Mandl, 1986
 Callistomimus pulchellus Barker, 1922
 Callistomimus quadricolor (Putzeys, 1877)
 Callistomimus quadriguttatus (Putzeys, 1877)
 Callistomimus quadrimaculatus Kolbe, 1889
 Callistomimus quadripustulatus (Gory, 1833)
 Callistomimus quinquemaculatus (Laferte-Senectere, 1851)
 Callistomimus rivularis Alluaud, 1932
 Callistomimus rubellus (Bates, 1892)
 Callistomimus rubricosus Alluaud, 1932
 Callistomimus rufiventris Britton, 1937
 Callistomimus rugosus Britton, 1937
 Callistomimus sennariensis Alluaud, 1932
 Callistomimus sexpustulatus (Boheman, 1848)
 Callistomimus sikkimensis Andrewes, 1921
 Callistomimus sinicola Mandl, 1981
 Callistomimus strigipennis (Fairmaire, 1901)
 Callistomimus subnotatus Andrewes, 1921
 Callistomimus suturalis Fleutiaux, 1887
 Callistomimus trichros Andrewes, 1936
 Callistomimus tumidipes Britton, 1937
 Callistomimus venustus Andrewes, 1921
 Callistomimus virescens Andrewes, 1921
 Callistomimus vitalisi Andrewes, 1921

References

Licininae
Carabidae genera